The 2009 FIA GT3 European Championship season was the fourth season of the FIA GT3 European Championship. The season began on 2 May at Silverstone and ended on 14 November 2009 at Zolder. The season featured six double-header rounds, with each race lasting for a duration of 60 minutes. Most of the events were support races to the 2009 FIA GT Championship season, the 2009 GT4 European Cup and the 2009 Lamborghini Super Trofeo.

Phoenix Racing pairing Christopher Haase and Christopher Mies claimed the overall title, with a fourth place in the final race of the season at Zolder. In the Teams Championship, Hexis Racing were champions ahead of Matech Racing and Team Rosberg.

Entries and drivers
Two new manufacturers join the FIA GT3 category in 2009. Audi, with their V10-powered R8 LMS, and Alpina's B6, based on the 6-Series. The Ford Mustang FR500GT3 does not return in 2009. Ferrari replaces its previous F430 GT3 with the new 430 Scuderia GT3, while Morgan's Aero 8 is replaced by the Aero Super Sport.

Also new for 2009 is an alteration in the structure of teams and manufacturers. Although manufacturers will still be allowed a maximum of six cars, teams are only limited to two cars. There is therefore a maximum of three teams which can campaign a single manufacturer. The manufacturers of Ascari, Dodge, Jaguar, Lamborghini, and Morgan will not be eligible for the Manufacturers Cup due to not supplying the minimum of four cars required to enter the Cup.

† – JMB Racing were allowed by the FIA to use a 2008 Ferrari F430 GT3 for their #14 entry at Silverstone due to not having a second 430 Scuderia GT3 prepared in time.

Schedule and results

Championships
Points are awarded to the top eight finishers in the order 10-8-6-5-4-3-2-1. Cars which failed to complete 75% of the winner's distance are awarded half the points awarded for completing the 75% race distance.

Drivers Championship

Teams Championship

Manufacturer Cups
The Manufacturer Cups are open to any manufacturer who supplies at two or more teams in the full season.  Points are awarded based on the driver's position within that manufacturer's class.

Aston Martin

Audi

BMW Alpina

Corvette

Ferrari

Ford

Porsche

References

External links
The official website of the FIA GT3 European Championship

GT3
FIA GT3
FIA GT3 European Championship